Ryu Sang-gu (Hangul: 류상구; born 1984), known by the stage name Deepflow (Hangul: 딥플로우) is a South Korean rapper, music producer, and CEO of the hip hop record label Vismajor Company. He won the award for Musician of the Year at the 2016 Korean Music Awards.

Personal life 
Earlier in February, Deepflow announced recently became a married man legally with non-celebrity. Due to the coronavirus, the planned wedding has been postponed. Wedding ceremony will be held on December 19, 2021

Discography

Studio albums

Charted songs

Awards and nominations

References 

Living people
1984 births
South Korean male rappers
South Korean hip hop record producers
Korean Music Award winners